Robert Leo Fahey   (born 30 April 1968, in Hobart, Tasmania), nicknamed "Bag", is an Australian real tennis player and the former World Champion of the sport, holding the title from 16 March 1994 to 21 May 2016 and again from 28 April 2018 to September 2022. Fahey retired from competitive Real Tennis following his loss to Camden Riviere in the 2022 World Championship.

On 27 April 2006, at the Oratory Tennis Club in Woodcote, South Oxfordshire, he matched the great Pierre Etchebaster's feat of seven consecutive defenses of the real tennis singles World Championship. The defence was against Tim Chisholm in the latter's third consecutive challenge. In May 2008 he again successfully defended his title, thus breaking Etchebaster's record, against Camden Riviere on the historic court at Fontainebleau Palace, France, winning 7 sets to 5 (6/1 3/6 5/6 6/4, 6/2 6/3 5/6 6/0, 6/1 2/6 1/6 6/5).  In May 2010 he retained his title for a record ninth time, defeating Steve Virgona 7 sets to 2. In April 2012 he retained his title for the 10th consecutive time, again defeating Steve Virgona 7 sets to 3 (6/5 3/6 6/1 6/3 6/4 6/3 3/6 5/6 6/2 6/3). He successfully defended his title in May 2014, at the Royal Melbourne Tennis Club, for the eleventh time, defeating Camden Riviere seven sets to three.

Fahey was finally defeated in the 2016 Real Tennis World Championship, by Camden Riviere by 7 sets to 2, at the National Tennis Club in Newport, Rhode Island (Riviere's home court).

Fahey regained the World Championship singles title on 28 April 2018, defeating Camden Riviere by 7 sets to 5, at The Queen's Club, London.

In 2000 and 2001 he won back-to-back Grand Slams, and a third in 2008.  In 2003 (Hobart), partnered with Steve Virgona, he won the World Doubles Championship; the pair successfully defended the title in 2005 (Fontainebleau), 2007 (Boston), 2009 (Seacourt - Hayling Island) and 2011 (RMTC - Melbourne).

A portrait of Fahey by Rupert Alexander was shortlisted for the BP Portrait Award 2012.

Fahey was appointed Member of the Order of the British Empire (MBE) in the 2017 British New Year Honours for services to sport.

In the 2019 Australian Queen's Birthday Honours List Fahey was awarded the Medal of the Order of Australia (OAM) for service to Real Tennis.

Singles titles
 World Champion: 1994, 1995, 1996, 1998, 2000, 2002, 2004, 2006, 2008, 2010, 2012, 2014, 2018 (since 1996 played on even years only)
 Australian Open: 1993, 1994, 1996, 1997, 1998, 2000, 2001, 2002, 2004, 2008, 2009, 2012, 2014, 2016
 British Open: 1995, 2000, 2001, 2003, 2005, 2006, 2007, 2008, 2009, 2010, 2011
 French Open: 1993, 1998, 1999, 2000, 2001, 2004, 2005, 2006, 2007, 2008, 2009, 2010, 2011, 2015
 U.S. Open: 1993, 2000, 2001, 2002, 2005, 2006, 2007, 2008, 2009
 IRTPA Championships (formerly UK Professional): 2001, 2002, 2003, 2004, 2007, 2009, 2010, 2015
 U.S. Professional / Schochet Cup: 2001, 2003, 2004, 2005, 2006, 2007, 2008, 2009
 European Open: 2005, 2006, 2007, 2011, 2015

Source:

Personal life

He is married to fellow real tennis player Claire Fahey and they have two children.

See also

 List of real tennis world champions

References

External links
 International Real Tennis Professionals Association: Robert Fahey profile
 The 2014 World Challenge
 Interview with Rob Fahey on the determination to required to be a World Champion for over 20 years

1968 births
Living people
Australian expatriate sportspeople in England
Australian real tennis players
Sportspeople from Hobart
Tennis people from Tasmania
Members of the Order of the British Empire